André Casterman (20 April 1899 – 4 January 1975) was a Belgian racing cyclist. He rode in the 1926 Tour de France.

References

1899 births
1975 deaths
Belgian male cyclists
Place of birth missing